Lemyra flavalis is a moth of the family Erebidae. It was described by Frederic Moore in 1865. It is found in China (Tibet, Yunnan, Sichuan), Nepal, India (Sikkim, Assam), Bhutan and Myanmar.

Subspecies
Lemyra flavalis flavalis (China: Tibet, Yunnan)
Lemyra flavalis carnea (Leech, 1899) (China: Sichuan)

References

 

flavalis
Moths described in 1865